Old Burleson is an unincorporated community in Franklin County, Alabama, United States.

A post office operated under the name Burleson from 1848 to 1909.

References

Unincorporated communities in Franklin County, Alabama
Unincorporated communities in Alabama